Maccabi Umm al-Fahm F.C. are a football club, from the north Israeli city of Umm al-Fahm. The club currently plays in Liga Bet North B division, the fourth tier of Israeli football. Home matches are played at the HaShalom Stadium.

History
The club was founded in 1972, and played in the lower divisions of Israeli football. In the 2010–11 season the club won Liga Alef North division, and was promoted to Liga Leumit, the second tier of Israeli football, where they played three seasons.

In the 2013–14 season, the club was relegated to Liga Alef after finished bottom of Liga Leumit, and set negative record of being the first club in the history of professional football in Israel, which have finished a season with a negative number of points (−4, after 5 points deducted), and without any win, drawing one game, and losing all the other 36 games.

The 2014–15 season was similarly poor, as the club dropped further to Liga Bet, after finished the season with 0 points, following a deduction of 1 point for fielding ineligible player, and completed a second successive season without win, drawing one game, and losing all the other 29 games.

Honours
Liga Alef North
Champions 2010–11
Liga Bet North B
Champions 2008–09
Liga Gimel Shomron
2004–05

References

External links
Maccabi Umm al-Fahm Israel Football Association 

Umm al-Fahm
Umm al-Fahm
Association football clubs established in 1972
1972 establishments in Israel
Sport in Umm al-Fahm
Arab-Israeli football clubs